Jaime Lorente López (born 12 December 1991) is a Spanish actor. He is best known for playing the roles of Denver in Money Heist and Nano in Elite.

Education 
Born on 12 December 1991, Jaime Lorente López studied Dramatic Art at The Superior School of Dramatic Art of Murcia and has a master's degree in advanced studies from the UNIR in Logroño, Spain.

Career 
Lorente performed in the theatre production Equus, for which he won the Best Actor Award in the first edition of the María Jesús Sirvent Awards. He has also acted in theatre productions such as El Público, La Vengadora de Las Mujeres, El Secreto a Voces and De Fuera Vendrá.

In 2016, Lorente began acting in the Antena 3 series El secreto de Puente Viejo as Elías Mato. In 2017, he portrayed "Denver" in the hit TV series, Money Heist, for which he was nominated for the "Best Supporting Actor on Television" Award by the Spanish Actors Union. In 2018, he portrayed "Nano" in the Netflix Original Series Élite. In 2020, Lorente will portray Rodrigo Díaz de Vivar "El Cid" in the historical Amazon Prime Video series El Cid.

In addition to acting, Lorente has published a book titled A propósito de tu boca, a collection of poems that he started writing in high school. He has also made forays into music, releasing his first EP (La noche) in 2022.

Filmography

Television

Films

Music

Music

Accolades

References 

1991 births
21st-century Spanish male actors
Living people
People from Murcia
Spanish male film actors
Spanish male television actors
Actors from the Region of Murcia